The Pawhuska Osages were a minor league baseball team that played in the Western Association in 1922. They were based in Pawhuska, Oklahoma, and they posted a record of 29–93, in part because they disbanded on August 16 of that year, and all remaining games were considered forfeits. They were managed by Clyde Wren, John Wuffli and Otis Stucker.

Baseball teams established in 1922
Baseball teams disestablished in 1922
1922 establishments in Oklahoma
1922 disestablishments in Oklahoma
Defunct minor league baseball teams
Professional baseball teams in Oklahoma
Defunct baseball teams in Oklahoma
Defunct Western Association teams
Osage County, Oklahoma